Asiab Jub may refer to:
 Asiab Jub, Kermanshah (اسياب جوب)
 Asiab Jub-e Farmanfarma, Kermanshah Province
 Asiab Jub, Kurdistan (آسياب جوب)